Sickle senna is a common name for several plants and may refer to:

Senna obtusifolia
Senna tora, native to Central America